is a common masculine Japanese given name.

Possible writings
Reiji can be written using different kanji characters and can mean:
礼二, "salute, two"
礼司, "salute, rule"
礼治, "salute, govern"
玲次, "sound of jewels, next"
怜児, "wise, child"
麗司, "lovely, rule"
零児, "zero, child"
零司, "zero, rule"
零時, "zero, time" (midnight)
伶史, "actor, history"
令治, "orders, govern"
澪士, "waterway, scholar"
The name can also be written in hiragana or katakana.

People with the name
, Japanese Nihonga painter
Reiji Kawashima (零士), Japanese voice actor
Leiji Matsumoto (零士), Japanese manga artist
Reiji Miyajima (礼吏), Japanese manga artist
Reiji Nagakawa (玲二), Japanese translator
Reiji Okazaki (令治), Japanese biologist
Reiji Yamada (玲司), Japanese manga artist

Fictional characters

Azuma Reiji, a character from Phantom ~Requiem for the Phantom~
Takigawa Reiji (レイジ), a character from the fighting game series Bloody Roar
Reiji (also known as "Rage"), a character in the manga Gravitation
Reiji Arisu (零児), the original character in the action RPG/tactical RPG hybrid Namco × Capcom
Reiji Akaba, called Declan Akaba in the English dub, the rival character in the anime and manga series Yu-Gi-Oh! Arc-V
Reiji Fujita (玲司), the main character in the manga and anime series Gallery Fake
Reiji Kageyama, antagonist of sci-fi/action manga and anime series Gate Keepers
Reiji Kokonoe of Kodomo no Jikan
Reiji Mitsurugi (怜侍), a character from the Japanese version of the Ace Attorney video game 
Reiji Mizuchi is from an anime called Beyblade: Metal Fusion series
Reiji Namikawa (零司), a minor character in the manga and anime series Death Note
Reiji Nogi (怜治), a villain in the Japanese tokusatsu series Kamen Rider Kabuto
Reiji Oozora (レイジ), a character in the manga and anime series Dragon Drive character
Reiji Oyama (礼児), a character in the fighting game series Power Instinct
Reiji Takayama (澪士), a character in the anime series based on the American comic book Witchblade
Reiji Sakamaki (レイジ), a character in the visual novel and anime series Diabolik Lovers
Reiji (レイジ), known as Reggie in the English dub, is a minor recurring character in the Diamond & Pearl Pokémon anime series and the older brother of Shinji (Paul).
Reiji Suwa (怜治 ), a character from Prince of Stride.
 Reiji Kotobuki, a character from Uta no Prince-sama.

See also
6565 Reiji, a Main-belt Asteroid

Japanese masculine given names